Yori is a village and jamoat in western Tajikistan. It is part of the city of Panjakent in Sughd Region. The jamoat has a total population of 19,045 (2015). It consists of 11 villages, including Yori (the seat), Dashtiqozy, Kishtudak and Veshist.

References

Populated places in Sughd Region
Jamoats of Tajikistan